The Douglas 31 and Douglas 32 are a series  of Canadian sailboats, that were designed by Ted Brewer and first built in 1967. The last boats of this design were built in 1982 and delivered as kits.

Production
The design was commissioned by Douglas Badgley, designed by Brewer as the Douglas 31 and initially built by Badgley's company, Douglas Marine Craft in Port Stanley, Ontario, Canada, with production commencing in 1967. Douglas Marine Craft went out of business in 1970-71 and creditors seized the company assets, including the design's molds.

Jeffrey White of North American Fiberglas Moldings of London, Ontario, acquired a set of Douglas 31 hull and deck molds and had Brewer modify the design to incorporate an extended reverse transom. The new version was known as the Douglas 32. In 1974, North American Fiberglas entered receivership, emerging as Command Yachts, under the same management and produced the Douglas 32 Mark II model. In about 1976 Command Yachts was purchased by De Leuw Cather Canada and the boat building division was shut down.

Bruce Peninsula Yachts of Port Elgin, Ontario then bought the molds and built the Douglas 32 Mark II, with a new cabin configuration.

Hullmaster Boats of Picton, Ontario, had also purchased at least one of the original Douglas 31 molds at about the same time that North American Fibreglas Mouldings had acquired their molds, and built the design as the Hullmaster 31, completing production in 1979.

Following Hullmaster's bankruptcy, Doug Smith acquired the Douglas 31 molds and built the design in the form of a kit for owners to finish. Smith then sold his business to Jed and Carol Benoit of J&C Fibercraft, based in Barrie, Ontario, who then used the molds to produce the Douglas 31.

Hinterhoeller Yachts built the last six Douglas 31 hulls in about 1982. These  were then delivered to customers as kits for owner completion.

Design
The Douglas 32 is a small recreational keelboat, built predominantly of fiberglass, with wood trim. It has a masthead sloop rig; a spooned, raked stem; a raised counter, reverse transom; a keel-mounted rudder controlled by a wheel and a fixed long keel. It displaces .

The design has a PHRF racing average handicap of 201.

See also
List of sailing boat types

Similar sailboats
Allmand 31
Aloha 32
Beneteau 31
C&C 32
Columbia 32
Contest 32 CS
Herreshoff 31
Hunter 31
Hunter 31-2
Hunter 32
Hunter 32 Vision
Marlow-Hunter 31
Mirage 32
Morgan 32
Niagara 31
Nonsuch 324
Ontario 32
Ranger 32
Roue 20
Watkins 32

References

External links

Keelboats
1960s sailboat type designs
Sailing yachts
Sailboat type designs by Edward S. Brewer
Sailboat types built by Hinterhoeller Yachts
Sailboat types built by J&C Fibercraft
Sailboat types built by Hullmaster Boats
Sailboat types built by Bruce Peninsula Yachts
Sailboat types built by Command Yachts
Sailboat types built by North American Fiberglas Moldings
Sailboat types built by Douglas Marine Craft